Sericodes may refer to:
 Sericodes (caddisfly), a genus of caddisflies in the family Leptoceridae
 Sericodes (plant), a genus of plants in the family Zygophyllaceae